The Wilson Community House is a historic community meeting hall at 10 Lake Drive in Wilson, Arkansas.  It is a single-story wood-frame structure, with a hip roof, weatherboard siding, and foundation of brick and stone piers.  It has Colonial Revival styling, including a hip-roofed entrance portico with groups of supporting Doric columns, and four-over-four sash windows.  It was built in 1906, and has served since then as a significant focal point for community events, with an early history including use as a church and school.

The building was listed on the National Register of Historic Places in 2015.

See also
National Register of Historic Places listings in Mississippi County, Arkansas

References

Event venues on the National Register of Historic Places in Arkansas
Colonial Revival architecture in Arkansas
Cultural infrastructure completed in 1906
National Register of Historic Places in Mississippi County, Arkansas
1906 establishments in Arkansas
Community centers in Arkansas
Wilson, Arkansas